Seven ships of the French Navy have borne the name Protée, in honour of Proteus.

French ships named Protée 
  (1701–1722), a 48-gun ship of the line 
  (1725), a frigate
  (1750–1770), a 64-gun ship of the line, lead ship of her class 
  (1773–1780), a 64-gun 
  (1862–1868), an aviso
  (1904–1914), a  
  (1932–1943), a

Notes and references

Notes

References

Bibliography 
 
 

French Navy ship names